is a Japanese television drama series that premiered on Fuji TV on October 13, 2011. The theme song of the series is "Zutto", by Aiko.

Cast
 Nana Eikura
 Miho Kanno
 Arata
 Junpei Mizobata
 Tomohiro Ichikawa
 Fumino Kimura
 Ren Mori
 Koen Kondo
 Takeshi Masu
 Shirō Sano
 Shigenori Yamazaki
 Maki Nishiyama
 Kenji Anan
 Midoriko Kimura

References

External links
  

2011 Japanese television series debuts
2011 Japanese television series endings
Japanese romance television series
Fuji TV dramas
Japanese drama television series
Television shows set in Okayama Prefecture